The Rooker–Feldman doctrine is a doctrine of civil procedure enunciated by the United States Supreme Court in two cases, Rooker v. Fidelity Trust Co.,  and District of Columbia Court of Appeals v. Feldman, . The doctrine holds that lower United States federal courts—i.e., federal courts other than the Supreme Court—should not sit in direct review of state court decisions unless Congress has specifically authorized such relief. In short, federal courts below the Supreme Court must not become a court of appeals for state court decisions. The state court appellant has to find a state court remedy, or obtain relief from the U.S. Supreme Court.

Another explicit legislative exception to this doctrine was the "Palm Sunday Compromise," a statute passed by Congress to permit federal courts to review the decisions of Florida courts in the Terri Schiavo case.

The doctrine has been held to apply to any state court decisions that are judicial in nature. For example, a judge's decision not to hire an applicant for a job is not a "judicial" decision. However, in the prisoner rights case of Forchion v. Intensive Supervision Parole, et.al., 240 F.Supp.2d 302 (2003) the federal district court Judge Irenas (Camden, NJ) interceded when it ruled "The Rooker–Feldman doctrine does not apply to this case. The ISP Resentencing Panel has final authority over the Plaintiff and there is no way of him appealing its decisions. Accordingly, this Court does have the authority to review the decisions of the panel".

In 2005, the Supreme Court revisited the doctrine in Exxon Mobil Corp. v. Saudi Basic Industries Corp., . The Court affirmed that the Rooker–Feldman doctrine was statutory (based on the certiorari jurisdiction statute), and not constitutional, holding that it applies only in cases "brought by state-court losers complaining of injuries caused by state-court judgments rendered before the district court proceedings commenced and inviting district court review and rejection of those judgments."

The Supreme Court has continued to narrow the doctrine, as in Lance v. Dennis, and seems to want to minimize the use of the doctrine. For a mock obituary of the doctrine, see Samuel Bray, Rooker Feldman (1923–2006) 9 Green Bag 2d 317.

The Rooker–Feldman doctrine is related to the Anti-Injunction Act, a federal statute which prohibits federal courts from issuing injunctions which stay lawsuits that are pending in state courts. Title 28, United States Code, Section 2283 reads:

A court of the United States may not grant an injunction to stay proceedings in a State court except as expressly authorized by Act of Congress, or where necessary in aid of its jurisdiction, or to protect or effectuate its judgments.

Notes